The Men's team recurve was one of the events held in archery at the 2012 Summer Paralympics in London.

Team recurve

Ranking round

Competition bracket

References 

M